JGR can refer to:
 Japanese Government Railways
 Java Gui for R
 Jet Grind Radio, a video game
 Joe Gibbs Racing, a group of NASCAR racing teams
 John G. Roberts, Jr. (born 1955), Chief Justice of the United States
 Journal of Geophysical Research
 Jessica González-Rojas (born 1976), New York State Assemblymember for the 34th Assembly District